The 2020 Blue-Emu Maximum Pain Relief 200 was the 9th stock car race of the 2020 NASCAR Gander RV & Outdoors Truck Series season, and the 20th iteration of the event. The race was originally supposed to be held on May 30, 2020 but was postponed to July 24, 2020 due to the COVID-19 pandemic. The race was held in Kansas City, Kansas at Kansas Speedway, a  permanent D-shaped oval racetrack. The race took the scheduled 134 laps to complete. At race's end, Austin Hill of Hattori Racing Enterprises would dominate the race and win, the 5th win of his career in the NASCAR Gander RV & Outdoors Truck Series, and the first of the season. To fill the podium, Brett Moffitt of GMS Racing and Grant Enfinger of ThorSport Racing would finish 2nd and 3rd, respectively.

Background 

Kansas Speedway is a 1.5-mile (2.4 km) tri-oval race track in Kansas City, Kansas. It was built in 2001 and hosts two annual NASCAR race weekends. The NTT IndyCar Series also raced there until 2011. The speedway is owned and operated by the International Speedway Corporation.

Entry list 

*Originally, Viens was slated to drive the #49, but the driver would change to Ray Ciccarelli for unknown reasons. As a result, the #83 would withdraw.

Starting lineup 
The starting lineup was determined by a random draw. Christian Eckes of Kyle Busch Motorsports would draw for the pole.

Race results 
Stage 1 Laps: 30

Stage 2 Laps: 30

Stage 3 Laps: 74

References 

2020 NASCAR Gander RV & Outdoors Truck Series
NASCAR races at Kansas Speedway
2020 in sports in Kansas
July 2020 sports events in the United States